The Pikachu virus, sometimes referred to as Poké Virus (not to be confused with Pokérus in actual Pokémon games), was a computer worm believed to be the first malware geared at children due to its incorporation of Pikachu from the Pokémon series. It was released on June 28, 2000, and arrived in the form of an email titled "Pikachu Pokemon" with the body of the e-mail containing the text "Pikachu is your friend."
Opening the attached executable shows users an image of Pikachu, along with a message stating: "Between millions of people around the world I found you. Don’t forget to remember this day every time MY FRIEND!" 
The worm itself appeared in the attachment to the email as a file named "PikachuPokemon.exe".

It was often compared to the Love Bug, though the Pikachu worm was noted to be far less dangerous and slower in its dissemination.

The banned Pokémon episode "Electric Soldier Porygon" contained references to a computer virus, but did not actually show one, aside from an imaginary scenario by Ash wherein an anthropomorphic germ (similar to Baikinman from Anpanman) is shown.

Spread
The worm was mainly spread through Microsoft Outlook email attachments. The email containing the attached worm-program propagated through infected users by sending itself to all contacts in the user's Outlook address book. The website in the body of the email lead to a clone of the official Pokémon.com website. It is possible this website downloaded a Trojan in the background if visited or was a phishing website and this may have assisted in the spread of the virus.

Execution
When the user clicks on the attachment, PikachuPokemon.exe adds the lines "del C:\WINDOWS" and "del C:\WINDOWS\system32"  to the file "autoexec.bat". These commands would be executed at the next boot, in an attempt to delete two critical directories of the Windows operating system. 
However, users would be given a prompt asking whether or not they wanted to delete those folders, since the author did not write the added lines as “del C:\WINDOWS\*.* /y” and “del C:\WINDOWS\SYSTEM\*.* /y” (the /y switches would have automatically chosen the yes option). 
This defect was the reason that the Pikachu worm did not cause more damage to computer systems.

See also
ILOVEYOU
Timeline of notable computer viruses and worms
Computer virus

References

Further reading
 

Hacking in the 2000s
Email worms